The Hemp Inc. mill in Spring Hope, North Carolina is the largest industrial hemp processing facility in the United States. It is on North Carolina Highway 581.

The mill, a  former sweet potato processing plant, contains a decorticator to separate hemp hurds from external fibers, and supercritical carbon dioxide extraction for CBD recovery.

Fiber products will become textiles and composites used in the automobile industry.

See also
Hemp in North Carolina

References

Agriculture in North Carolina
Cannabis in North Carolina
Hemp agriculture in the United States